Asfastan (also Romanized as Asfastān; also known as Asbastār, Asbestān, Asbetsān, Asfatān, and Aspastan) is a village in Ilat-e Qaqazan-e Gharbi Rural District, Kuhin District, Qazvin County, Qazvin Province, Iran. At the 2006 census, its population was 99, in 31 families.

References 

o.o

Populated places in Qazvin County